Deadly Tide is a rail shooter video game developed by Rainbow Studios and published by Microsoft  exclusively for Microsoft Windows.

Plot
In the year 2445, a race of hostile aquatic aliens arrives on Earth. One of their ships sits at the bottom of the Pacific Ocean, raising sea levels continuously for 5 years until almost 88% of the surface is submerged. In order to effectively fight the aliens, the fictional Earth Ocean Alliance develops the "Hydras", one-man submarine fighter craft.

The player takes on the role of the last remaining fighter pilot. The objective is to travel through the alien-infested seas and fend off the targets long enough to complete the missions.

The game ends with the player character planting a bomb inside an alien ship and driving away the remaining aliens. However, the player is trapped inside one of the vessels, and his fate is uncertain as the game concludes.

Gameplay
As in Rainbow Studios' other rail shooters The Hive and Ravage D.C.X., the player shoots targets that appear as live sprites in front of a full-motion video background. Occasionally, the video will stop and switch to a still background, which the player can pan around 360 degrees. The weapons include unlimited standard lasers and a limited supply of bombs.

In some levels, the player moves on foot and not in a vehicle. The gameplay, however, remains essentially unchanged.

External links
 

1996 video games
Alien invasions in video games
Microsoft games
Rail shooters
Rainbow Studios games
Single-player video games
Video games developed in the United States
Video games set in the 25th century
Video games with underwater settings
Windows games
Windows-only games